Matthew Gates Marksberry (born August 25, 1990) is an American former professional baseball pitcher. He played for the Atlanta Braves of Major League Baseball (MLB) in 2015 and 2016.

Early life
Marksberry was born in Cincinnati, Ohio on August 25, 1990 to father Bob and mother Sandra. He attended Glen Este High School.

Career

Atlanta Braves
Marksberry played college baseball at Campbell University. He was drafted by the Atlanta Braves in the 15th round of the 2013 Major League Baseball Draft.

He started the 2015 season with the Single-A Carolina Mudcats and was later promoted to the Triple-A Gwinnett Braves, without having played at the Double-A level. After eleven games with Gwinnett, Marksberry was called up to the majors for the first time on July 30, 2015 and made his MLB debut the next day, pitching  innings.

Marksberry was invited to spring training in 2016, but did not make Opening Day roster. He was sent to the Double-A Mississippi Braves to start the season, and recalled on April 23. He made an appearance against the New York Mets, then was optioned to Gwinnett after the game. Marksberry was next recalled on June 25, and spent four days in the major leagues. On July 28, Marksberry was recalled for the third time during the 2016 season. He was placed on the 15-day disabled list on July 31, and moved to the 60-day disabled list in September, ending his season. Marksberry was released in March 2017.

Somerset Patriots
On August 2, 2017, Marksberry signed with the Somerset Patriots of the Atlantic League. He was released on August 6, 2017.

Québec Capitales
On August 17, 2017, Marksberry signed with the Québec Capitales of the Can-Am League.

Melbourne Aces
In early 2018, Marksberry was playing for the Melbourne Aces in the Australian Baseball League.

Lancaster Barnstormers
On February 7, 2018, Marksberry was traded from the Québec Capitales to the Lancaster Barnstormers of the Atlantic League of Professional Baseball. He became a free agent following the 2018 season.

Arizona Diamondbacks
On January 4, 2019, Marksberry signed a minor league deal with the Arizona Diamondbacks that included an invitation to spring training. He was released on March 14, 2019.

Lancaster Barnstormers (second stint)
On March 20, 2019, Marksberry signed with the Lancaster Barnstormers of the Atlantic League of Professional Baseball. He became a free agent following the 2019 season.

Sydney Blue Sox
Marksberry signed with the Sydney Blue Sox of the Australian Baseball League for the 2019/20 season.

On March 5, 2020, Marksberry signed with the Sioux City Explorers of the American Association of Independent Professional Baseball. However, the team was not selected by the league to compete in the condensed 2020 season due to the COVID-19 pandemic. Marksberry was not chosen by another team in the dispersal draft, and therefore became a free agent.

Personal life
After the 2016 season, Marksberry reported having stomach pains. He underwent a colonoscopy, and had a seizure and suffered a collapsed lung during the procedure. He was placed in a medically induced coma.

References

External links

1990 births
Living people
American expatriate baseball players in Canada
Atlanta Braves players
Baseball players from Cincinnati
Campbell Fighting Camels baseball players
Carolina Mudcats players
Danville Braves players
Glen Este High School alumni
Gwinnett Braves players
Lancaster Barnstormers players
Lynchburg Hillcats players
Major League Baseball pitchers
Melbourne Aces players
Québec Capitales players
Rome Braves players
American expatriate baseball players in Australia